Giedo Gijsbertus Gerrit van der Garde (born 25 April 1985 in Rhenen, Netherlands) is a Dutch racing driver, currently competing in the 2022 IMSA SportsCar Championship for TDS Racing. From 2018 to 2021 he competed in the FIA World Endurance Championship for Racing Team Nederland in the LMP2 class. He is best known for driving in Formula 1 for the Caterham F1 team in 2013, and joined Sauber as a reserve driver in 2014.

Career

Karting
Van der Garde had a successful karting career, winning the Dutch championship in 1998. In Super A he was best rookie in 2001 and world champion in 2002.

Formula Renault
The following year he joined the Formula Renault 2000 Championship and finished sixth, driving for Dutch team Van Amersfoort Racing. On the strength of his performance he became part of the Renault F1 Driver Development programme.

Formula Three
He joined the Formula 3 Euro Series in  2004 with Signature-Plus but after finishing the year ninth he was dropped by Renault Driver Development. A move to Team Rosberg for 2005 yielded another ninth in the series.

For 2006 he joined the ASM team, which had dominated the season in 2005 with Lewis Hamilton and Adrian Sutil. The team claimed the top two places in the championship once more in 2006 – but it was Van der Garde's team mates Paul di Resta and Sebastian Vettel who topped the leader board. The Dutchman ended the year sixth with a single victory.

Formula Renault 3.5 Series

On 17 December 2006 Van der Garde also announced that he would drive in the Formula Renault 3.5 Series for Victory Engineering, a team that works together with Carlin Motorsport.

Van der Garde had podium positions in mind for the season, but even though he was the most consistent driver, always around 6th or 5th, he did not win nor reach the podium. He finished the season 6th, 3rd in the Rookie of the year standings. He received several offers for tests in GP2, from teams like DAMS and Arden International, during which he impressed.

He eventually signed with P1 Motorsport to compete in the 2008 season.

In the first race of the 2008 FR3.5 season in Monza, Van der Garde managed to qualify on pole for the feature race. Due to regulations, he started 8th in the sprint race because of the reverse grid order in the sprint race. He came through the field to clinch victory in the sprint race, and easily converted his pole position into a victory in the feature race to show his fine form in the start of the season.

In the second race at Spa, he narrowly missed out on pole by 0.033 seconds after previously topping the tables at all practice sessions. In the sprint race, Julien Jousse collided into him forcing Van der Garde into retiring from the race. Having qualified second for the feature race, he lost a position at the start. He immediately overtook Mikhail Aleshin on the first lap to regain his position, and later overtook Marco Bonanomi for the lead which he held to the checkered flag.

After this strong start to the season, Van der Garde was never headed in the championship and duly won it with two races remaining.

GP2 Series

Van der Garde signed to drive for the iSport International team in the 2008–09 GP2 Asia Series season, and in the 2009 GP2 Series season. At the Hungaroring, he took his first victory, in the sprint race. He added two more wins before the end of the season en route to seventh in the championship standings.

He had not been due to compete in the 2009–10 GP2 Asia season, but competed in the second round for Barwa Addax. He drove for the same team in the 2010 GP2 Series season, equalling his seventh place in the drivers' championship, whilst team-mate Sergio Pérez was runner-up.

Van der Garde remained with Barwa Addax for the 2011 GP2 Asia Series season, with Charles Pic replacing the Formula One-bound Pérez as his team-mate. He finished third in the championship, behind Romain Grosjean and Jules Bianchi, and led the main series after two rounds despite not winning a race. He did, however, take his first series pole position and fastest lap at Catalunya. He originally took pole position for the Monaco round as well, but was then penalised for an incident in qualifying. He took no points from the weekend and lost his championship lead to Grosjean, who eventually secured the title with one round of the series remaining. He held second place in the championship until the last round of the season at Monza, where he had a disastrous weekend and slipped back to fifth in the standings, behind Luca Filippi, Bianchi and Pic.

As part of his deal to become the Caterham Formula One team's reserve driver, Van der Garde joined the marque's GP2 team for the 2012 season, alongside Rodolfo González. He returned to the winner's circle with race victories at Catalunya and Singapore, but again was not consistent enough to mount a championship challenge, finishing sixth in the points standings.

On 9 February 2015, Van der Garde returned to this series for testing, racking up over 350 km at the Circuit Ricardo Tormo. He drove for Campos Racing (previously known as Addax), for the first time.

Formula One
2006 saw Van der Garde being brought into the McLaren Young Drivers Programme.

On 15 December 2006 Van der Garde was confirmed as the Super Aguri Formula One team's test and reserve driver for the 2007 season.

On 1 February 2007 Van der Garde was unexpectedly announced by Spyker F1 as the team's test and reserve driver. On 2 February 2007 Super Aguri confirmed their belief their existing contract with Van der Garde was still in force, stating "Super Aguri F1 Team has a valid contract with Giedo van der Garde to drive for the team in the position of Friday and Test Driver for the 2007 FIA Formula One World Championship. The contract was submitted by the SAF1 Team to the Contracts Recognition Board on 23rd January 2007."
However, on 20 June 2007 Van der Garde tested at Silverstone with Spyker, indicating the contract dispute had been resolved.
Spyker originally intended Van der Garde to be the team's Friday driver at the Australian Grand Prix, but he failed to obtain the necessary superlicence from the FIA in time.

Van der Garde was a candidate to race in Formula One for Virgin in 2011, but that seat eventually went to Belgian Jérôme d'Ambrosio.

Caterham (2012-13)

On 4 February 2012, it was announced that Van der Garde would be Reserve Driver for Caterham F1 for the 2012 Formula One season. Van der Garde's first Friday practice session came at the 2012 Chinese Grand Prix; he went on to complete 6 Friday practice sessions throughout the 2012 season.

On 1 February 2013, Van der Garde's management announced that he would drive for Caterham as their second driver for the 2013 Formula One season, next to Charles Pic. Van der Garde finished his first Formula One race with an 18th place at the 2013 Australian Grand Prix.

At the 2013 Monaco Grand Prix, Van der Garde achieved Caterham's highest ever qualifying place with a P15, this was also the first time that a Caterham made it to Q2 in the 2013 season. Van der Garde equalled his career best 15th during the race despite an early collision with Williams F1 driver Pastor Maldonado. He later improved on this performance by finishing 14th during the 2013 Hungarian Grand Prix, ahead of his teammate Pic as well as Marussia drivers Jules Bianchi and Max Chilton.

He then bested his previous best qualifying position at the 2013 Belgian Grand Prix by qualifying 14th after electing to go on slicks on a continuously drying track, having finished the Q1 session in 3rd place after adopting a similar strategy. But despite a good start that saw him remain in touch with the more established teams for the first few laps, he was unable to improve upon his grid position and finished 16th, a lap down on the leaders.

Sauber (2014–15)
2014
On 21 January 2014, it was announced that Van der Garde had joined Sauber F1 Team as a reserve and test driver for the 2014 season.  He took part in the first free practice session in seven of the season's Grands Prix in this role.

During events that became public in 2015, Van der Garde has claimed that, although in June 2014 he was guaranteed a position as one of the Sauber's two nominated race drivers for the  Formula One season, by November 2014, the team informed him that he was no longer required. The team instead announced Marcus Ericsson and Felipe Nasr as their race drivers for the 2015 season, causing Van der Garde to file an international arbitration complaint with the Swiss Chambers’ Arbitration Institution in December 2014.

2015
On 2 March 2015, the Swiss Chambers’ Arbitration Institution released a partial award upholding Van der Garde's contract and ordering Sauber to "refrain from taking any action the effect of which would be to deprive Mr. van der Garde of his entitlement to participate in the 2015 Formula One Season as one of Sauber's two nominated race drivers."

On 5 March 2015, through his management company, Van der Garde then filed an application in an Australian Court to enforce the Swiss award. In this instance, Australia was the appropriate jurisdiction as it was the location of the first F1 Grand Prix for the season. The court permitted Sauber's new drivers, Ericsson and Nasr (who were not parties to the Swiss arbitration), to be represented and heard.

On 11 March 2015, Van der Garde obtained Court orders enforcing his Swiss award thus compelling Sauber to permit Van der Garde to participate at the Australian Grand Prix held in Melbourne, with F1 sessions scheduled from Friday, 13 to Sunday, 15 March. Sauber's response was to appeal that decision and publicly announce that they would not compromise the safety of the team or other drivers by putting Van der Garde in the car, because the Sauber C34 chassis had  been tailored to fit Ericsson and Nasr who, through their lawyers, also joined in the appeal.

The appeal was heard the following day, on Thursday, 12 March 2015, at which time Sauber also argued that Van der Garde's contract had been terminated by the team in February with the approval of the FIA's Contract Recognition Board and that Van der Garde violated the confidentiality clauses of the contract by discussing it with the media. Lawyers representing Ericsson and Nasr further argued that Van der Garde had not followed due process by failing to give prior notice of his legal action until after it was instituted. That appeal, however, was dismissed with the court upholding the previous order for Sauber to allow Van der Garde be allowed to participate in that weekend's race. Further, the court adjourned the hearing until the following day to hear submissions on contempt of court proceedings brought by Van der Garde's lawyers against Sauber's team principal, Monisha Kaltenborn.

Due to the risk of having its assets seized for disobeying court orders, Sauber opted to abort participation in Friday morning's first practice session for the Australian Grand Prix. Nevertheless, based on media speculation about Bernie Ecclestone's intervention to avoid further negative publicity on the sport, Ericsson and Nasr did participate in Friday afternoon's second practice session.

On Saturday, 14 March 2015, the dispute reached a temporary resolution thanks to Van der Garde announcing that he would forego racing in Melbourne, with a view to finding a more permanent solution in the future. The Sauber team and its new drivers for 2015, Ericsson and Nasr, were thus able to complete the Australian Grand Prix's Saturday qualifying session and Sunday race.

On 18 March 2015, Van der Garde confirmed that he and Sauber had reached a settlement after he relinquished, once and for all, his rights to race in F1 with the team. In return for termination of the contract by mutual consent, it is reported that Van der Garde received compensation in the amount of USD$16 million. The controversy, however, continued thanks to a statement released by Van der Garde revealing further background and indicating that his intention had also been that of promoting the rights of racing drivers whose contracts are often not honoured. In response, the Sauber team expressed surprise at Van der Garde's post-settlement statement opting to not comment further on  the matter.

Post-Sauber (2015–)
In April 2015, Van der Garde's manager downplayed rumours of a return to Formula 1 during that season, with Manor Marussia, adding that the focus was for a 2016 race seat in DTM or LMP1.

TV career 
As Max Verstappen joined Formula 1 in 2015, Van der Garde was often asked for his analysis in Dutch TV Shows. Between 2015 and 2021, Van der Garde was a usual guest in several Dutch TV shows to talk about Verstappen in Formula One. In December 2021, it was announced that Van der Garde would join the analyst team of Viaplay from 2022 onwards.  At the new Dutch sports channel, Van der Garde is accompanied by other analysts such as former Formula One driver Christijan Albers and racing driver Tom Coronel.

Racing record

Career summary

† As Van der Garde was a guest driver, he was ineligible for points.
‡ Points only counted towards the Michelin Endurance Cup, and not the overall LMP2 Championship.
* Season still in progress.

Complete Formula 3 Euro Series results
(key) (Races in bold indicate pole position) (Races in italics indicate fastest lap)

Complete Formula Renault 3.5 Series results
(key) (Races in bold indicate pole position) (Races in italics indicate fastest lap)

† Driver did not finish the race, but was classified as he completed more than 90% of the race distance.

Complete GP2 Series results
(key) (Races in bold indicate pole position) (Races in italics indicate fastest lap)

Complete GP2 Asia Series results
(key) (Races in bold indicate pole position) (Races in italics indicate fastest lap)

Complete Formula One results
(key) (Races in bold indicate pole position) (Races in italics indicates fastest lap)

Complete European Le Mans Series results

† As van der Garde was a guest driver, he was ineligible to score points.

Complete FIA World Endurance Championship results

Complete 24 Hours of Le Mans results

Complete IMSA SportsCar Championship results
(key) (Races in bold indicate pole position; races in italics indicate fastest lap)

† Points only counted towards the Michelin Endurance Cup, and not the overall LMP2 Championship.
* Season still in progress.

Personal life
In December 2013, Van der Garde married his long-time girlfriend Denise Boekhoorn, daughter of Dutch businessman and investor Marcel Boekhoorn, at a ceremony in Zwolle, Netherlands.

References

Career details from driverdb.com, retrieved 16 December 2006.

External links
 
 

1985 births
Living people
People from Rhenen
Dutch racing drivers
Karting World Championship drivers
Dutch Formula Renault 2.0 drivers
Formula Renault Eurocup drivers
Formula 3 Euro Series drivers
World Series Formula V8 3.5 drivers
GP2 Asia Series drivers
GP2 Series drivers
Dutch Formula One drivers
Caterham Formula One drivers
24 Hours of Daytona drivers
24 Hours of Le Mans drivers
FIA World Endurance Championship drivers
ART Grand Prix drivers
Van Amersfoort Racing drivers
Signature Team drivers
Team Rosberg drivers
Victory Engineering drivers
ISport International drivers
Racing Team Nederland drivers
G-Drive Racing drivers
Extreme Speed Motorsports drivers
Audi Sport TT Cup drivers
WeatherTech SportsCar Championship drivers
European Le Mans Series drivers
Sportspeople from Utrecht (province)
P1 Motorsport drivers
Jota Sport drivers
TDS Racing drivers
United Autosports drivers